Nativity of Our Lord Catholic School is located in Saint Paul, Minnesota, United States.  It is a private and Catholic PreK-8 grade school. The school was founded in 1928 and has expanded over the years, the most recent time being in 2008. A large renovation, including the new library and new entrance way were added that year. In December 2017 and January 2018, the school's gymnasium got a new floor after the old floor began lifting during a November renovation. It was also re-painted. Nativity of Our Lord School is a community of parents, teachers, staff, and parishioners committed to helping each student grow into the person God has called them to be through faith, academics, and character development.

Alumni 
Richard M. Schulze, founder and chairman of Best Buy.
Matt Birk, Center for the Baltimore Ravens
T. D. Mischke, Talk show host on WCCO (AM) radio
Josh Hartnett, Actor
B.J. Kirk, Meteorologist, KDLT

External links
 Nativity of Our Lord Catholic School

Education in Saint Paul, Minnesota
Private elementary schools in Minnesota
Private middle schools in Minnesota
Schools in Ramsey County, Minnesota